Luštěnice is a municipality and village in Mladá Boleslav District in the Central Bohemian Region of the Czech Republic. It has about 2,200 inhabitants.

Administrative parts
Villages of Voděrady and Zelená are administrative parts of Luštěnice.

Geography
It lies in the Jizera Table. The Vlkava River flows through the municipality.

History
The first written mention of Luštěnice is from 1268. From 1570 to 1739, the village was part of the Kosmonosy estate, owned were the Czernin family. In 1739, Luštěnice was purchased by Josef Scherzer of Kleinmühl. He has the baroque Luštěnice Castle built around 1740. The Gallas family owned the village from 1774 to 1805, then they sold it to the Nostitz family.

Sights
The main landmark of Luštěnice is the Church of Saint Martin. It is a Baroque church from 1739 that replaced the old parish church.

The Luštěnice Castle is a late Baroque building from the 18th century, built on the site of an old fortress. From 1805, the castle was used as an administrative building and fell into disrepair. Today it is unused, but it is gradually being repaired.

Gallery

References

External links

Villages in Mladá Boleslav District